Leitzinger is a surname. Notable people with the surname include:

Antero Leitzinger (born 1962), Finnish historian
Butch Leitzinger (born 1969), American racing driver
Stephan Leitzinger, maker of bassoons